This is a list of stations on the underground railway system (Metrô Rio) in Rio de Janeiro, Brazil. Nowadays, the system has two lines denominated numerically: broadly Linha 1 serves the south and central zones while Linha 2 serves the north. There used to be an interchange between them at Estácio Station, but now Linha 2 uses the rails of Linha 1 to get at Botafogo Station, closing interchange at Estácio.

Line 4 (yellow line) links West Zone, in the neighbourhood of Barra da Tijuca, to South Zone, in Ipanema. 

Line 3, serving Niterói and São Gonçalo municipalities is planned.

Currently, there are 41 operational stations.

Current lines

Linha 1 (Line 1 - Orange) 

 General Osório
 Cantagalo
 Siqueira Campos
 Cardeal Arcoverde
 Botafogo†
 Flamengo†
 Largo do Machado†
 Catete†
 Glória†
 Cinelândia†
 Carioca†
 Uruguaiana†
 Presidente Vargas†
 Central†
 Praça Onze
 Estácio‡
 Afonso Pena
 São Francisco Xavier
 Saens Peña
 Uruguai

† Station is shared with Line 2 on work days
‡ Station is shared with Line 2 on holidays and weekends

Linha 2 (Line 2 - Green) 
 Cidade Nova
 São Cristóvão
 Maracanã
 Triagem
 Maria da Graça
 Nova América/Del Castilho
 Inhaúma
 Engenho da Rainha
 Thomaz Coelho
 Vicente de Carvalho
 Irajá
 Colégio
 Coelho Neto
 Acari/Fazenda Botafogo
 Engenheiro Rubens Paiva
 Pavuna

Linha 4 (Line 4 - Yellow) 

 Nossa Senhora da Paz
 Jardim de Alah
 Antero de Quental
 São Conrado
 Jardim Oceânico

Under construction/planned

Linha 3 (Line 3 - Blue) 
It is a line planned to go from Niterói to Guaxindiba, in São Gonçalo. Plans also include an extension from Niterói to Carioca Station, in Rio.

Inactive stations 
 Morro de São João/Rio Sul, on Line 1 (between Cardeal Arcoverde and Botafogo stations)
 Gávea, on Line 2 (between Antero de Quental and São Conrado stations)

Planned stations 
 Belford Roxo, on Line 2
 São João de Meriti, on Line 2
 Duque de Caxias, on Line 2
 Barra da Tijuca, on Line 4
 Alvorada, on Line 4
 Galeão (possible transference to the airport), on Line 5

Bibliography

References 

Rio de Janeiro Metro
Rio de Janeiro
Rio de Janeiro